The 1896 Iowa Agricultural Cyclones football team represented Iowa Agricultural College (later renamed Iowa State University) as an independent during the 1896 college football season. Under head coach Pop Warner, the Cyclones compiled an 8–2 record, shut out seven of ten opponents, and outscored all opponents by a combined total of 303 to 46. James W. Wilson was the team captain.

Between 1892 and 1913, the football team played on a field that later became the site of the university's Parks Library.

Schedule

Roster

References

Iowa Agricultural
Iowa State Cyclones football seasons
Iowa Agricultural Cyclones football